Saint Malo was a small fishing village that existed along the shore of Lake Borgne in St. Bernard Parish, Louisiana as early as the mid-eighteenth century until it was destroyed by the 1915 New Orleans hurricane.

The exact date of the establishment of Saint Malo is disputed. The settlement may have been formed as early as 1763 or 1765 by Filipino deserters and escaped slaves of the Spanish Manila galleon trade. The members of the community were commonly referred to as Manila men, or Manilamen, and later Tagalas.

Filipino-Americans residing in the region (referred to as "Manilamen" on the account of Manila being the capital of the Philippines) were recruited by local pirate Jean Lafitte to join his "Baratarians", a group of privately-recruited soldiers serving under the American forces under the command of Andrew Jackson, in the defense of New Orleans. They played a decisive role in securing the American victory, firing barrage after barrage of well-aimed artillery fire.

History
Small communities of criminals, fugitive slaves, and Filipinos commonly found refuge along Lake Borgne in the eighteenth and nineteenth centuries. The settlement of Saint Malo was established, by some accounts, as early as 1763 by Filipinos who deserted Spanish ships during the Manila galleon trade. It is also possible that the community was established later into the early nineteenth century. The Manilamen settled in the marshlands of Louisiana where no Spanish officials could reach them. Reasons for their desertion varied; however their desire to escape brutalities dealt by the Spanish is generally regarded as the main reason.

Beginning in 1784, Juan San Maló led a group of fugitive slaves below New Orleans and in St. Bernard Parish which stole livestock, destroyed property, and seeded other chaos. In May of that year, the Spanish government began preparing for an expedition to capture San Maló and his maroons after a group of Americans were murdered. San Maló retreated with his group to live in the extensive marshland surrounding Lake Borgne, but Spanish forces led by Francisco Bouligny eventually captured him along with sixty maroons. On June 19, 1784, he was hanged in Jackson Square.

The same area that San Maló and his group found refuge became known by his name. It wasn't until March 31, 1883 that the journalist Lafcadio Hearn published an article in Harper's Weekly which documented the community firsthand. The article is the first published article about the Filipinos in the United States.

Saint Malo was completely destroyed, along with much of the region, by the New Orleans hurricane of 1915 and consequently the remnants of the community assimilated into New Orleans.

Role in the War of 1812
Filipino-Americans residing in the region, referred to as "Manilamen," were recruited by local pirate Jean Lafitte to join his "Baratarians", a group of privately recruited soldiers serving under the American forces under the command of Andrew Jackson, in the defense of New Orleans. They played a decisive role in securing the American victory, firing barrage after barrage of well-aimed artillery fire. Historian Marina Espina states that the defending American force under Jackson consisted of "regular army troops, state militia, western sharpshooters, two regiments and pirates from the Delta Swamps (which included the aforementioned Filipinos)."

Description

Dwellings 

The Manilamen lived in small houses supported above the water by stilts in a similar style to the nipa huts of the Philippines. Wood needed to construct dwellings had to be acquired elsewhere as it could not be easily found in the swamps. The palmetto and woven-cane construction often did not withstand the harsh climate of marsh and had to be repaired or replaced frequently. Windows were draped with netting to protect from mosquitoes and other biting insects. Dwellings lacked furniture including tables, chairs, and bed frames. Mattresses were stuffed with dried Spanish moss which had been a common practice in the region and had even been used to upholster the Ford Model T. The mattresses were laid upon a series of shelves mounted against the walls. According to Hearn, the fishermen slept at night “among barrels of flour and folded sails and smoked fish.”

Diet

The diet of the community consisted mainly of seafood, principally raw fish with oil and vinegar. Fish was also smoked and hung for later consumption. Chickens and pigs were raised among the dwellings, and depictions illustrated small gardens along the walkways and porches.

Family

The Manilamen of Saint Malo were entirely devoted a subsistence lifestyle based upon fishing and trapping. Rarely did women live in the village. In fact, there were no women in the community during Hearn's visit. If fisherman did have families, they often lived in New Orleans and its environs. The reason for this can be attributed to the isolated and harsh conditions of the settlement. Manilamen often courted and married Isleño, Cajun, and Indigenous women. When it was possible, Manilamen sent profits made from fishing to acquaintances in Manila so that it may be delivered to their families.

Government

Due to the isolation of Saint Malo, the Manilamen paid no taxes and the community lacked law enforcement officials. The village had never been visited by any official from St. Bernard Parish, the state of Louisiana, or the United States government. As a result, the community governed itself. In extreme cases, the eldest man of the community would consider disputes and mediate over the situation. In the rare case that a given verdict is not accepted, the individual was imprisoned in a “fish-car,” which was a makeshift prison cell. The offender generally accepted the terms given to him due to the harsh physical conditions, lack of food, and/or rising tide.

Religion

The predominant religion of the Manilamen was Roman Catholicism. Priests rarely went to visit the settlement due to its isolation.

Modern day 
Some descendants of these Filipinos continue to live in Louisiana today as multiracial Americans. A number of Isleños and their descendants possess Filipino ancestry, so much so that Los Isleños Heritage and Cultural Society of St. Bernard lists "Filipino" as a significant community that developed the Isleño identity.

In November 2019, a historical marker for the settlement was installed at Los Isleños Museum Complex.

Notable Filipino settlements in Louisiana 

 Alombro Canal (Plaquemines Parish) 
 Camp Dewey (Plaquemines Parish) 
 Bayou Cholas (Jefferson Parish) 
 Bassa Bassa (Jefferson Parish) 
 Leon Rojas (Jefferson Parish) 
 Manila Village (Jefferson Parish)

See also

Filipino Americans
Jean Lafitte, Louisiana
List of fishing villages
Manila galleon

References

Further reading

Asian-American culture in Louisiana
Filipino-American history
History of Louisiana
Fishing communities
Former populated places in St. Bernard Parish, Louisiana